Kiseik (Keseyek) is a rural locality (a village) in Leuzinsky Selsoviet, Kiginsky District, Bashkortostan, Russia. The population was 2 as of 2010.

Geography 
Kiseik is located 19 km northeast of Verkhniye Kigi (the district's administrative centre) by road. Leuza is the nearest rural locality.

References 

Rural localities in Kiginsky District